Ross Shaw Sterling (February 11, 1875March 25, 1949) was an American politician who was the 31st Governor of Texas, serving a single two-year term from January 20, 1931, to January 17, 1933.

Early years
Sterling was born in Anahuac in Chambers County near Houston, Texas. He grew up on a farm and, after little formal education, began working as a clerk at the age of 12.

Career
At the age of 21, Sterling launched his own merchandising business. In 1911, his brother Frank Sterling, other oilmen, and he formed the Humble Oil Company, a predecessor of present-day Exxon-Mobil. They were joined in the venture by their sister, Florence M. Sterling. Sterling and his brother Frank and his sister, Florence, were referred to as the "Trio".

In addition to the oil industry, Sterling was involved in a railroad company, the former Houston Post newspaper,  banking, and real estate in the Houston area. He was a member of the Houston Port Commission. He served as chairman of the Texas Highway Commission under his predecessor, Governor Dan Moody.

Public service
A Democrat, Sterling defeated former Governor Miriam "Ma" Ferguson and several other candidates in the 1930 primary race for governor.  During Sterling's term in office, the East Texas oil fields experienced rapid and uncontrolled development.  The Railroad Commission of Texas attempted proration, but the courts struck down the plan. Because of the chaotic situation, Sterling declared martial law in four counties for six months. National Guard troops were sent to the oil fields to limit waste and control production. This action was later declared unwarranted by the federal district court and the U.S. Supreme Court, and the Railroad Commission's plan for proration was accepted. Cotton prices continued to decline during Sterling's term in office.

Sterling's gubernatorial secretary, Jessie Ziegler of Houston, apparently exerted wide latitude in his administration of the office. She was known to have altered mail correspondence in which Sterling became intemperate with demanding constituents so as not to close the door on gaining future support from such irate voters. She was known to advise him on decision making, including the issuance of pardons in the aftermath of scandals in the previous Ferguson administrations. After Sterling's loss in the 1932 Democratic primary to Miriam Ferguson, whom he had defeated in 1930, Ziegler took a similar but lower-paying staff job with a state senator.

Sterling's loss in the 1932 primary was the closest primary defeat for an incumbent governor in United States history.

Personal life and death

He wed Maud Abbie Gage on October 10, 1898.

Sterling died in Fort Worth on March 25, 1949, and is buried at Glenwood Cemetery in Houston.

Three Texas schools are named after him, Sterling High School in Baytown, Sterling High School in Houston, and Ross Sterling Middle School in Humble, Texas. In addition, his grand-nephew, Ross N. Sterling, a Republican, became a United States federal judge in Texas under appointment of U.S. President Gerald R. Ford Jr.

In 1925, Sterling's daughter Mildred married the prominent architect Wyatt C. Hedrick of Fort Worth.

Sterling's former house, built about 1910, was moved in 1999 from 106 Westheimer Road to the intersection of Bagby and Rosalie to undergo restoration.  
In 2015 it opened as a bar & restaurant called Sterling House

References

Further reading

External links
 
 http://www.lib.utexas.edu/taro/tslac/40032/tsl-40032.html

Democratic Party governors of Texas
American businesspeople in the oil industry
Businesspeople from Texas
Texas Oil Boom people
ExxonMobil people
1875 births
1949 deaths
Burials at Glenwood Cemetery (Houston, Texas)
People from Houston
People from Anahuac, Texas